Melville Henry Watkins (May 15, 1932 – April 2, 2020) was a Canadian political economist and activist and professor emeritus of economics and political science at the University of Toronto. He was a founder and co-leader with James Laxer of the Waffle, a left-wing political formation within the New Democratic Party that advocated an "independent socialist Canada" and Canadian nationalism. He was appointed a Member of the Order of Canada in 2019.

Life and career
Watkins was born on May 15, 1932, on a farm near McKellar, Ontario; one of six children born to Wilmot and Sadie Watkins. At the age of 16, he and his twin brother, Murray, enrolled at the University of Toronto where among his lecturers was  Harold Innis, whose staples thesis became a lifelong influence on his thinking. He pursued graduate work as a classical economist at the Massachusetts Institute of Technology. He became a professor of economics at the University of Toronto in 1958 and, in 1963, published an academic article, "A Staple Theory of Economic Growth”, which revised and updated Innis's staples thesis and was influential in the growing Canadian economic nationalist movement and also brought him to the attention of Canadian finance minister Walter L. Gordon.

His political activity followed his work heading up the federal government's Task Force on Foreign Ownership and the Structure of Canadian Investment, which investigated the impact of growing American control of the Canadian economy. Striking this task force of economists had been urged upon the Pearson government by former Liberal finance minister Walter Gordon. The "Watkins Report", as it was widely known, was issued in 1968 and recommended strict regulation of foreign investment in Canada, particularly foreign ownership of Canadian businesses and resources. Its findings led to the establishment of the Canada Development Corporation to help facilitate greater Canadian ownership as well as the Foreign Investment Review Agency to regulate foreign ownership.

His concern for Canadian economic sovereignty led him to join others in 1969 to found the Waffle, which issued a Manifesto for an Independent Socialist Canada calling for increased public ownership of the economy as a means of securing Canadian independence from the United States, as well as establishing social and economic equity. The group was essentially expelled from the New Democratic Party (NDP) in 1972 and while Watkins supported the group's attempt to form a new left-wing political party, the Movement for an Independent Socialist Canada, his interest and involvement waned, particularly when he left to spend time in the far north to investigate the living conditions of the Dene people. After the collapse of the Waffle in 1974, Watkins spent most of his time teaching and writing.

In the early 1970s, Watkins was hired by the Dene Nation (then known as the Indian Brotherhood of the Northwest Territories) as the economic adviser for their delegation to the Mackenzie Valley Pipeline Inquiry.

In the 1980s and 1990s, he was active in opposition to the Canada–United States Free Trade Agreement and then to the North American Free Trade Agreement describing them as "charters of rights for corporations."

He eventually rejoined the NDP, and ran as its candidate in Beaches—East York in the 1997 and 2000 federal elections. He placed second on both occasions behind Liberal Maria Minna.

Watkins supported the New Politics Initiative, which was formed in 2001 to attempt to convince the NDP to join with social movements to found a new left-wing party. He retired from academia and moved to Constance Bay in eastern Ontario, where he continued to write a column for This Magazine and pieces for other publications. He was also a board member of and regular contributor to the online newsmagazine Straight Goods. He also served as president of Science for Peace, and a was a was member of Pugwash Canada.

Bibliography
Madness & Ruin: Politics and the Economy in the Neoconservative Age (1992).  
Canada Under Free Trade (1993).  
Dene Nation: The Colony Within (1977).

Electoral record

References

External links
Mel Watkins's Blog at rabble.ca
Mel Watkins Author from the Canadian Centre for Policy Alternatives

1932 births
2020 deaths
20th-century Canadian economists
Canadian nationalists
Canadian political scientists
Canadian socialists
New Democratic Party candidates for the Canadian House of Commons
Political economists
Academic staff of the University of Toronto
Writers from Ontario
Members of the Order of Canada
Massachusetts Institute of Technology School of Science alumni